"Incapable" is a song by American singer and songwriter Keyshia Cole from her seventh studio album, 11:11 Reset (2017). The song was written by Cole, Gabrielle Nowee, Marcella Araica, and Elijah Blake, with production being handled by Danja and Guitarboy. The song was released for digital download and streaming as the album's second single on August 25, 2017, by Epic Records. An R&B ballad, it is backed by an acoustic guitar and includes a sample of Rose Royce's 1976 single "I'm Going Down". Lyrically, the song discusses a relationship where one partner is putting in more effort than the other. Cole elucidated that the song was inspired by her own experiences in her previous romantic relationships.

Music critics responded positively to "Incapable", praising Cole's vocals and its lyrics. An accompanying music video, directed by Mike Ho, was released on October 6, 2017. It takes place in a speakeasy and depicts Cole as she gets revenge on her boyfriend after suddenly finding out that he had been cheating on her. The video received positive reviews from critics, who praised its retro style theme. Cole performed the song live for the first time at The Wendy Williams Show on October 20, 2017.

Background and release 
"Incapable" was written by Keyshia Cole, Gabrielle Nowee, Marcella Araica, and Elijah Blake, while produced by Danja and Guitarboy. The audio was mixed by Jaycen Joshua, Maddoxx Chhim, and Araica. Randy Urbanski worked as the recording engineer, while Chhim provided additional support as assistant engineer. The vocals were produced by Cole, with assistance from Blake. The song was recorded and mixed at NRG Recording Studios in North Hollywood, Los Angeles. 

On July 24, 2017, she previewed the song during a studio session on the premiere of the fourth season of the reality television series Love & Hip Hop: Hollywood. Epic Records released the song for digital download and streaming on August 25, 2017, as the second single from 11:11 Reset, before distributing it to urban contemporary radio stations in the United States on September 17. On September 30, the song was ranked the fifth most-added single at urban adult contemporary radio. In October, Cole gave an interview about 11:11 Reset with Stephanie Ogbogu of Vibe. Cole explained the inspiration behind the song, saying: "This song channels my own experience as a woman, realizing that sometimes things are not completely about you. Sometimes it’s about someone else not being able to give you that. Someone not being capable of even loving you the way that you love."

Composition and lyrics

The song is composed in the key of B♭major, set in common time signature, and has a moderately fast tempo of 180 beats per minute. Instrumentation consists of an acoustic guitar, a Roland TR-808, and an emotional rhythm. It includes a sample of American singer Rose Royce's single "I'm Going Down" (1976). Jamie Wexler of ThisisRnB noted the elements of classic ballads and touches of old-school soul music, and Chris Rizik of SoulTracks interpreted the composition as a power ballad with a "bluesy undertone". Lyrics include: "It's time to grow up / I embarrassed myself enough / 'Cause I wouldn't leave you / Even my family know the truth, yeah." Cole further sings about the relationship in the chorus, singing, "Oh, what a feeling / The one that I thought that I needed / Was incapable of needing me back / Incapable of loving like that."

Lyrically, the song discusses a relationship where one partner is putting in more effort than the other. An editor from Rap-Up viewed the lyrics as "heartbreaking" and felt that they revolve around an "ill-fated relationship". Elle Breezy of Singersroom felt that the lyrics reference Cole's split from Daniel Gibson and that the song tells "the heartbreaking tale of realizing the person she loved didn't put in the same efforts into the relationship". Isha Thorpe of iHeartRadio also felt that the lyrics focus on her split from Gibson, despite not being solely written by Cole.

Critical reception 
"Incapable" was met with generally positive reviews from music critics. Royal Bey from The Source felt that the "strong" ballad reflects Cole's "uncanny" ability to hold "beautiful" notes. Da'Shan Smith  of Billboard labeled the song as an example of traditional R&B and declared that Cole "flirts with mixing trap 808s beneath the old swing of the '60s" on the song. According to Ken Hamm from Soul Bounce, "Incapable" is a ballad about "coming to terms with the fact that the one you want just isn't the one for you". Hamm further added that Cole uses "an old school sound blending blues, gospel and even a little country and lyrics that feel personal yet poetic" and described the first verse as "a come to Jesus" one. 

An editor from TheGrio thought that the song "talks about a lover who simply doesn't have what it takes", while Biana Garwood of Ebony deemed it as a "melancholy" track. Keithan Samuels, writing for Rated R&B, classified "Incapable" as part of Cole's "solid foundation on songs related to love and relationships". James Wong of Tokyo Weekender described the song as "distinctively Keyshia", while Tony Centeno from Vibe described it as "unique".

Music video

Background and synopsis 

A music video for "Incapable", directed by Mike He, was made available through Cole's Vevo account on October 6, 2017. Prior to its premiere, Cole debuted a trailer during her appearance on the American talk show The Real. Cole had also posted several images of herself on set via her official Instagram account one month prior to the release. In the video, Cole and her love interest walk into a speakeasy, where men are gambling and music is playing in the background. After they sit down together, Cole then goes to the bathroom, where she overhears a conversation between two women in which one of them admits to the other that she is having an affair with Cole's love interest. As "Incapable" starts to play, Cole is shown wearing a sleeveless starch white top and white wide brim hat while delivering a "heart-wrenching" performance of the song; this scene appears throughout. Impressed by her performance, members of the audience join the stage to start dancing and singing with her. A waitress later walks up to the love interest to deliver him a plate full of drinks but then mistakenly spills the drinks on his lap. Cole stands in front of the table as it happens and then aggressively walks away, leaving her love interest humiliated.

Reception 
Critics praised the video for its retro style and felt that Cole was paying homage to the 1920s decade. Samuels of Rated R&B described the video as "cinematic". D-Money of Soul Bounce viewed the video as "vintage-inspired" and felt that the retro style overshadows the plot, making the video "that much more interesting". Mikey Fresh of Vibe complimented the video's concept and its production, writing: "Having overcome of her share of shitty relationships, the Oakland-raised talent goes way back with her new video." Sarah Michel of VH1 praised the wardrobe and choreography in the video and also interpreted that it ends just like "almost all of those situations". An editor from Singersroom felt that Cole gave her love interest a "subtle payback" before leaving him and described the speakeasy as a "Cotton Club-styled venue". Garwood of Ebony felt that Cole had decided "to take things into her own hands by getting revenge on the man who stole her heart" in the video.

Live performances 
On January 31, 2017, Cole performed a preview of "Incapable" live on Jimmy Kimmel Live!, following the performance of its preceding single, "You". Breezy of Singersroom praised the performance and noted that Cole "pushed through performing the soulful ballad", despite having complications when fixing her earpiece while performing. Cole performed the song for The Wendy Williams Show on October 20, 2017, while wearing a white pantsuit with a red fur coat and top hat and being accompanied by male backup dancers. Antwane Folk of Rated R&B described the performance as "heartfelt" and compared the outfit worn by Cole during the performance to the signature look of fictional character Carmen Sandiego, while an editor from ThisisRnB described the performance as "stirring". 

On October 22, 2017, Cole performed the song during BET Her's inaugural television special BET Her Fights: Breast Cancer, and during the reunion of the fourth season of Love & Hip Hop: Hollywood the following day. On November 26, Cole performed the song at the 2017 Soul Train Music Awards, with the performance replicating the music video. Trent Fitzgerald of The Boombox described the performance as "dazzling" and declared that it was a "sexy rendition" of the song. Hamm of Soul Bounce complimented Cole's vocals, describing it as a "emotional, albeit by-the-numbers performance" and that "stood out" amongst her past live performances. Mark Elibert of Billboard described the performance as "exceptional".

Credits and personnel
Recording
 Recorded and mixed at NRG Recording Studios in North Hollywood, Los Angeles

Personnel 

 Keyshia Cole – vocals, songwriter, vocal producer
 Elijah Blake – songwriter, vocal producer
 Marcella Araica – songwriter, mixing
 Gabrielle Nowee – songwriter
 Danja – production

 Guitarboy – production
 Randy Urbanski – recording, audio engineer
 Maddoxx Chhim – mixing, engineer
 Jaycen Joshua – mixing

Credits adapted from 11:11 Reset album liner notes.

Charts

Release history

References

External links
 

2010s ballads
2017 singles
Keyshia Cole songs
Epic Records singles
2017 songs
Songs written by Elijah Blake
Songs written by Marcella Araica
Song recordings produced by Danja (record producer)
Contemporary R&B ballads